The Grand Canyon of the Yellowstone is the first large canyon  on the Yellowstone River downstream from Yellowstone Falls in Yellowstone National Park in Wyoming.

History

Although trappers and prospectors who visited the Yellowstone region had knowledge of the canyon, the first significant descriptions were publicized after the Cook–Folsom–Peterson Expedition of 1869 and the Washburn-Langford-Doane Expedition of 1870.

When Charles W. Cook first viewed the canyon after traveling west from the Lamar Valley on September 20, 1869, he subsequently wrote these words in his journal:

I was riding ahead, the two pack animals following, and then Mr. Folsom and Mr. Peterson on their saddle horses.  I remembered seeing what appeared to be an opening in the forest ahead, which I presumed to be a park, or open country.  While my attention was attracted by the pack animals, which had stopped to eat grass, my saddle horse suddenly stopped.  I turned and looked forward from the brink of the great canyon, at a point just across from what is now called Inspiration Point.  I sat there in amazement, while my companions came up, and after that, it seemed to me that it was five minutes before anyone spoke.

A year later during the Washburn expedition, on August 30–31, 1870, Lt. Gustavus C. Doane described the canyon with a bit more scientific detail:

In 1890, Bozeman resident H.F. Richardson (known as Uncle Tom) was given a permit to operate a ferry across the Yellowstone River near the site of today's Chittenden Bridge and take tourists down into the canyon below the lower falls on Uncle Tom's Trail.  Although the original trail no longer exists, there is still a steep stairway down to the base of the lower falls that is called Uncle Tom's Trail. Uncle Tom's Trail is approximately a 3-mile hike.

Important Canyon landmarks
 Agate Creek 
 Artist Point 
 Calcite Spring * Cascade Creek 
 Inspiration Point 
 Grand View 
 Lookout Point 
 Overhanging Cliff 
 Point Sublime 
 Seven Mile Hole 
 Silver Cord Cascade

Geology

The specifics of the geology of the canyon are not well understood, except that it is the result of erosion by the Yellowstone River, not by glaciation. After the Yellowstone Caldera eruption of about 600,000 years ago, the area was covered by a series of lava flows. The area was also faulted by the doming action of the caldera before the eruption. The site of the present canyon, as well as any previous canyons, was probably the result of this uplift and related faulting, which allowed erosion to proceed at an accelerated rate. The area was also covered by the glaciers that formed during several ice ages. Glacial deposits probably filled the canyon at one time, but have since been eroded away, leaving little or no evidence of their presence.

The canyon below the Lower Yellowstone Falls was at one time the site of a geyser basin that was the result of rhyolite lava flows, extensive faulting, and heat beneath the surface (related to the hot spot). No one is sure exactly when the geyser basin was formed in the area, although it was probably present at the time of the last glaciation. The chemical and heat action of the geyser basin caused the rhyolite rock to become hydrothermally altered, making it very soft and brittle and more easily erodible (sometimes likened to baking a potato). Evidence of this thermal activity still exists in the canyon in the form of geysers and hot springs that are still active and visible. The Clear Lake area, which is fed by hot springs, south of the canyon is probably also a remnant of this activity.
According to Ken Pierce, U.S. Geological Survey geologist, at the end of the last glacial period, about 14,000 to 18,000 years ago, ice dams formed at the mouth of Yellowstone Lake. When the ice dams melted, a great volume of water was released downstream causing massive flash floods and immediate and catastrophic erosion of the present-day canyon. These flash floods probably happened more than once. The canyon is a classic V-shaped valley, indicative of river-type erosion rather than glaciation. Today the canyon is still being eroded by the Yellowstone River.

The colors in the canyon are also a result of hydrothermal alteration. The rhyolite in the canyon contains a variety of different iron compounds. When the old geyser basin was active, the "cooking" of the rock caused chemical alterations in these iron compounds. Exposure to the elements caused the rocks to change colors. The rocks are oxidizing; in effect, the canyon is rusting. The colors indicate the presence or absence of water in the individual iron compounds. Most of the yellows in the canyon are the result of iron present in the rock rather than,  as many people think, sulfur.

See also
 The Grand Canyon of the Yellowstone (1872), by Thomas Moran
 The Grand Canyon of the Yellowstone (1901), by Thomas Moran

Notes

External links

Landforms of Yellowstone National Park
Canyons and gorges of Wyoming
Hot springs of Wyoming
Landforms of Park County, Wyoming
Tourist attractions in Park County, Wyoming
Yellowstone River